Lemaître, Lemaitre, Le Maitre, or variation, is a French surname meaning "the master" – derived from the Latin word "magister". 

Notable people with the surname include:

Lemaître
 Frédérick Lemaître (1800–1876), French actor and playwright 
 Georges Lemaître (1894–1966), Belgian Roman Catholic priest and astronomer, who formulated the "Big Bang" theory of cosmologic origin of the physical universe.
 Named for Georges Lemaître:
 Lemaître (crater), an impact crater on the Moon
 1565 Lemaître, a minor planet
 the Friedmann–Lemaître–Robertson–Walker metric
 the Lemaître metric
 the Lemaître–Tolman metric
 Lemaitre (band), Norwegian indie electronic band
 Georges Lemaître ATV, an unmanned spacecraft
 Jules Lemaître (1853–1914), French critic and dramatist
 Maurice Lemaître (1928-2018), French painter
 Jean Lemaître (mechanical engineer) (1898-1974), Belgian mechanical engineer, who developed a steam locomotive exhaust

Lemaitre
 Christophe Lemaitre (born 1990), French sprinter
 Pierre Lemaitre (born 1951), a French author and a screenwriter
 Rafael Lemaitre, French carcinologist

LeMaitre/Le Maitre
 George D. LeMaitre (1933–2018), American vascular surgeon
 LeMaitre Vascular, company founded by the surgeon in 1986
 Jade Le Maître (fl. 2010s), a roboticist

See also
Lemaitre (band), Norwegian indie electronic duo

 
 
 Le Maistre (surname)
 Maitre (surname)

French-language surnames